Santa Rosa de Cabal is a town and municipality in the Risaralda Department, of west central Colombia, on the western slopes of the Andean Cordillera Central.

It is a commercial and manufacturing centre for the fertile agricultural and pastoral hinterland. Silkworms are raised in the vicinity. There are silver, gold, and mercury mines nearby.

A thermal pool called "Termales" is open for visitors.

Symbols

Flag: Rectangle of proportions 1:2 terciated by fess white, green and white. Alternatively: On a field Argent 1:2 a fess Vert.

Coat of arms: Party per pale and per chevron reduced engrailed Argent, Vert and Gules. In saltire over the first two fields, a Latin cross bendwise Gules surmounted by an axe bendwise sinister Proper, its blade upward and inward. On middle base a rose Argent barbed and seeded Or. The shield is ensigned by a three-towered mural crown Or with doors Sable. On a scroll Azure the motto 'Somos Libres' Sable.

In Spanish: Escudo partido y entado en punta. Primero, campo de plata. Segundo, campo de sinople. Brochante sobre ambos campos, una cruz latina de goles y un hacha en natural, dispuestos en sautor. Tercero, en campo de gules una rosa de plata con semillas y espinas de oro. Encima una corona mural de tres torres. En listel de blau 'Somos Libres' en sable.

External links
 Commercial And Tourist Guide Santa Rosa De Cabal 
 Santa Rosa de Cabal official website

Municipalities of Risaralda Department